Haynesville or Hayneville can refer to a place in the United States:

Hayneville, Alabama
Hayneville, Georgia
Haynesville, Louisiana
Haynesville, Maine
Haynesville, Missouri
Haynesville, Texas

See also

 Hainesville (disambiguation)